Tarnab (also Romanized as Tarnāb; also known as Tarūnaz) is a village in Kandovan Rural District, Kandovan District, Meyaneh County, East Azerbaijan Province, Iran. At the 2006 census, its population was 262, in 50 families.

References 

Populated places in Meyaneh County